Yamaguchi Tadasada (October 18, 1843 – March 21, 1902) was an Imperial Japanese Navy veteran of the Boshin War and Meiji-era Japanese politician. He was the second governor of Ibaraki Prefecture (1872). He was Grand Chamberlain of Japan (1878–1884). He was a recipient of the Order of the Sacred Treasure (3rd class, 1888; 1st class, 1902) and the Order of the Rising Sun (2nd class, 1895).

References

Bibliography
歴代知事編纂会編『新編日本の歴代知事』歴代知事編纂会、1991年。
秦郁彦編『日本官僚制総合事典：1868 - 2000』東京大学出版会、2001年。
『朝日日本歴史人物事典』朝日新聞社、1994年。
日本歴史学会編『明治維新人名辞典』吉川弘文館、1981年。
大植四郎編『明治過去帳』新訂初版、東京美術、1971年（原著私家版1935年）。
内閣「主猟局長兼宮中顧問宮主殿頭正三位勲二等男爵山口正定勲位進級ノ件」明治35年。国立公文書館 請求番号：本館-2A-017-00・勲00095100

1843 births
1902 deaths
Imperial Japanese Navy officers
People of the Boshin War
Military personnel from Ibaraki Prefecture
Governors of Ibaraki Prefecture
Recipients of the Order of the Sacred Treasure, 3rd class
Recipients of the Order of the Sacred Treasure, 1st class
Recipients of the Order of the Rising Sun, 2nd class